Pinheyschna is the scientific name of a genus of dragonflies from the family Aeshnidae. These relatively large dragonflies are also known as hawkers.

Species
The genus Pinheyschna includes the following species:
Pinheyschna meruensis  - Meru hawker
Pinheyschna moori  - Zambesi hawker
Pinheyschna rileyi  - bullseye hawker
Pinheyschna subpupillata  - stream hawker
Pinheyschna yemenensis  - Yemen hawker

References

Aeshnidae
Anisoptera genera